The Bombardier Global Express is a large cabin, 6,000 nmi / 11,100 km range business jet designed and manufactured by Bombardier Aviation (formerly Bombardier Aerospace).

Announced in October 1991, it first flew on 13 October 1996, received its Canadian type certification on 31 July 1998 and entered service in July 1999.

Initially powered by two BMW/Rolls-Royce BR710s, it shares its fuselage cross section with the Canadair Regional Jet and Challenger 600 with a new wing and tail.

The shorter range Global 5000 is slightly smaller and the Global 6000 is updated and has been modified for military missions. The longer range Global 5500/6500 are powered by new Rolls-Royce Pearl engines with lower fuel burn and were unveiled in May 2018.

The larger and stretched Global 7500/8000 have longer ranges.

Development

Project definition
After acquiring Canadair along with its Challenger 600 business jet in 1986, Bombardier studied a longer range business aircraft in which it aimed to carry eight passengers and four crew over 12,000 km (6,500 nmi) at Mach 0.85.To meet this goal a joint-definition team was established at the company's Montreal facility in the early 1990s. By 1994, the team comprised 200 engineers, evenly divided between Canadair and various partners, including Japanese company Mitsubishi Heavy Industries and Anglo-German engine manufacturer BMW Rolls-Royce.

These various partners independently designed their own elements of the aircraft and shared a stake in the program. The choice of suppliers also influenced the aircraft design, with its various systems being selected before the detailed design phase. The CATIA  software was used for the kinematics, to feed finite-element analysis software for structural design, and computational fluid dynamics software for aerodynamics, the latter being confirmed by wind tunnel testing.

The new aircraft was designed to use the minimum number of components while still ensuring that no single failure would result in a diversion or the inability to dispatch a flight.  Bombardier worked towards a 99.5% dispatch reliability goal. As operators sought a level of safety enjoyed by airline aircraft, Bombardier was influenced to use  design rules, such as the incorporation of a maintenance computer to detect, indicate, and isolate faults, (although ETOPS rules were not a design requirement). A conventional mechanical flight control system was selected in the new aircraft design instead of  fly-by-wire.  This was mainly due to the high development expense and customer apprehension of fly-by-wire.

Launch and flight testing
On 28 October 1991, the Global Express was unveiled at the  convention. On 20 December 1993, the programme was launched. In June 1994, its high-speed configuration was frozen while the low-speed configuration was established in August 1994. By then, most critical design decisions were taken and almost all suppliers had been selected. In January 1995, the definition phase was winding down before detailed design.

By June 1995, the backlog was over 40 aircraft, sold out until 2000, leading to Bombardier to expand its early production plans. Bombardier guaranteed the empty weight and range to reply to Gulfstream criticism. Around 100 sales were needed to cover the development costs. During October 1995, the first prototype manufacture commenced, the first sections were expected in December at de Havilland's Toronto, while final assembly was to start in March 1996. By June 1996, the prototype was complete and conducting flight-readiness reviews ahead of its roll-out and first flight.

On 13 October 1996, the first prototype performed its maiden flight from Toronto, one month later than planned, lasting for 2 hours 46 minutes and attaining 11,000 ft (3,350 m) and 210 kn (390 km/h). The flight test programme used four prototypes, accumulating 2,200 flight hours. the Bombardier Flight Test Center in Wichita, Kansas was extended by 9,100 m2 (100,000 ft2) for the test programme. On 3 February 1997, the second prototype made its first flight and the third in May 1997.

In late 1995, type certification was forecast for March 1998. On 31 July 1998, Canadian type certification was granted, European and US approvals followed shortly thereafter. The first 15 aircraft were to be delivered before January 1999, the Global Express entered service in July 1999.

Production
The Global Express is assembled at the Downsview Airport in Toronto. It is then flown for final completion to one of several sites, including Montreal, Savannah, Georgia, or Cahokia, Illinois.

Japanese Mitsubishi Heavy Industries builds the wing and centre fuselage sections at its Toronto facility. Bombardier subsidiaries involved are Canadair as the design leader and nose manufacturer; Short Brothers in Belfast for the engine nacelles design and manufacture, horizontal stabiliser and forward fuselage; and de Havilland Canada for the rear fuselage, vertical tail and final assembly. The landing gear is produced by Dowty, flight controls by Sextant Avionique, the fuel system by Parker Bertea Aerospace, the core avionics by Honeywell, the APU by AlliedSignal, the electrical system by Lucas Aerospace, and the air management system by ABG-Semca.

In May 2015, production was reduced because of lower demand, caused by slowing economy and geopolitics in Latin America, Russia and China markets. By October 2018, Bombardier had a backlog of 202 aircraft valued at C$14.1 billion ($11 billion), including 128 Global Express aircraft: 67 Global 5000/6000 and four Global 5500/6500.
The Global Express program cost $800 million.

Design

The semi monocoque airframe is made of lightweight aluminum alloys and composite materials. 
It has a low wing, tricycle landing gear and fuselage-mounted engines. 

The clean-sheet design draws upon the earlier Canadair CL-600 and Bombardier CRJ.
It shares its fuselage cross-section with these aircraft, paired with a new T-tail and wing.
The latter is a supercritical airfoil with a 35° wing sweep and winglets.
This flexible wing naturally attenuates turbulence.
It was initially powered by two BMW-Rolls-Royce BR710 turbofans controlled by FADEC.
The flightdeck features a six screen Honeywell Primus 2000 XP EFIS suite.

The Global Express was the business jet with the largest cabin, until being surpassed by the later Gulfstream G650.
It can accommodate 12 to 16 passengers in three cabin sections: mostly a forward four-chair club section, a central four-seat conference grouping and an aft three-place divan facing two chairs.
Most have a forward galley, crew rest chair and crew lavatory.
The 10.3-psi cabin pressurization maintains a 4,500-ft. cabin altitude up to FL 450 and 5,680 ft. at the FL 510 ceiling.

Operational history

It can fly intercontinental ranges without refuelling (e.g. New York City–Tokyo) or between most two points in the world with only one stop.
In this class, the Global Express competes with the Airbus Corporate Jet, Boeing Business Jet and Gulfstream G550/650.

Most missions are between 3.5 and 4.5 hours in length and cover 1,500-2,000 nmi; flight times can extend to 10 hours at Mach 0.85 (488 knots at ISA) or 12 hours at Mach 0.82-0.83 (476 knots ISA), or a maximum of 13 hours with clear weather at the destination and multiple alternates nearby.
It burns 5,000 lb. of fuel for the first hour, 4,000 lb the second, 3,000 lb the third and 2,500 lb during the final hour.

The average trip lengths for most operators is 2.5 hours, where the aircraft will cruise between Mach 0.85 and Mach 0.89, making it one of the fastest long range jets available as of 2016.

A checks come at 750 hour intervals while C checks have been extended from 15 to 30 months in 2012.

Variants

Global 5000

The Global 5000 was announced on 25 October 2001 and launched on 5 February 2002 with letters of intent for 15 aircraft with a  MTOW and a  range at Mach 0.85.
The first aircraft flew on 7 March 2003.
It was introduced in April 2005, and there were 224 in service in 2018.

Early models kept the Global Express Honeywell Primus 2000XP avionics, updated with Rockwell Collins Fusion avionics since 2012.

It can carry between eight and 19 passengers, the new seat converts to a full berth; there is an optional private room aft and the galley has room to prepare 16 five-course meals.
It was priced at $40M in 2008, it has forward and aft lavatories, the crew rest area was removed, but could be restored.
The tail fuel tank is removed and fuel is limited in the wings, some avionics are rearranged to gain usable cabin length and the interior completions allowance is 3,200 kg.

In 2018, its unit cost was US$50.44 million.

In 2018, Early models with Honeywell avionics are sold for $10–20 million, while post-2012 aircraft with the modern Cockpit can fetch $22–36 million.
Major inspection every 180 months cost $800,000-1.2 million and two 8,000h engine overhauls can run $4 million.
The cheaper and more efficient Gulfstream G450 or Falcon 900LX are slower, have less range and smaller cabins.

Global Express XRS

The Global Express XRS was announced on 6 October 2003 during the NBAA Convention at Orlando, Florida.

Global 6000

Production of the third-generation Global 6000 started in 2012.
Its flexible wing and  wing loading, the highest among its competitors, gives a comfortable ride in turbulence.
A Checks are scheduled every 750 hours, and for C Checks every 30 months, while engine reserves amount to $260 per hour.
Over 315 were delivered by March 2019, while its competitors include the more fuel-efficient  Dassault Falcon 8X, the  Gulfstream G600 or even the  G650.

Bombardier's Vision flight deck is upgraded with Rockwell Collins Pro Line Fusion avionics from the Express/XRS Honeywell Primus 2000.
It has improved acoustical insulation compared to its predecessor.
In 2018, its unit cost was US$62.31 million,
but competition from the Gulfstream G650ER pressured it to a $40 million value from $62 million in 2016.
It offers higher cruise speed, improved cabin layout and lighting.
The range is increased by adding a 1,486 lb (674 kg) fuel tank at the wing root.

Global 5500/6500

The engines have 9% more thrust, their certification was announced and are already test flying.
The Global 5500 lists for $46 million while the Global 6500 lists for $56 million.

By October, 70% of the flight testing hours were completed.
The programme involves two flight-test Global 6500s, as the 5500 is a simple  shrink.
The redesigned wings are built by Mitsubishi Heavy Industries.
By December, the flight-test program was nearly three-quarters complete.
By May 2019, 90% of the flight testing was completed by two modified 6000s and one modified 5000.

On 24 September, Bombardier announced the Transport Canada Type Certification of both models, before entry-into-service later in 2019 and FAA/EASA approval.
Bombardier announced the Global 6500 entry-into-service on 1 October.
EASA Type Certification of both models was announced on 15 October 2019.
FAA Type Certification of both variants was announced on 23 December 2019.
Bombardier announced the entry-into-service of the Global 5500 on 25 June 2020. The first Global 5500 was delivered on 23 July 2020, to " longtime Bombardier customer Unicorp National Developments, headquartered in Orlando, Florida."

Military variants 

The Global Express has been modified for military missions.
 GlobalEye multi-role AEW&C, a Global 6000 with the SAAB Erieye's ER AESA radar for the United Arab Emirates Air Force
 Project Dolphin: Conversion of Global 6000 by Marshall into  surveillance aircraft for United Arab Emirates. Two converted.
 The Raytheon Sentinel is a surveillance aircraft formerly used by the Royal Air Force
 Saab Swordfish maritime patrol aircraft
 E-11A, United States Air Force designation for three Global 6000s being used as a platform for the Battlefield Airborne Communications Node.

A BD-700 has also carried the High-Altitude Lidar Operational Experiment (HALOE) payload, deploying to Africa and Afghanistan to survey large areas rapidly.

In January 2020, the German Federal Ministry of Defence chose the Global 6000 over the unmanned Northrop Grumman MQ-4C Triton for the “Persistent German Airborne Surveillance System” (PEGASUS) program to better integrate in the air traffic control.

On 15 March 2019 Turkey's Presidency of Defense Industries, SSB, announced that two green Bombardier Global 6000s had been delivered to the facilities of Turkish Aerospace to undergo modification to the Hava SOJ (air stand-off jammer) configuration.

Operators

Most operators fly 450 to 600 hours per year, but fleet operators frequently fly more than 100 hours per month.
By February 2015, over 600 aircraft accumulated more than 1.5 million flight hours and 570,000 cycles. In May 2018, 20 years after the type's introduction, more than 750 Globals were in service.

Half the 6000s are registered in North America, mostly in USA. NetJets operates at least six and large corporations like Aetna, Caterpillar, CitiGroup, Limited Brands, McDonald's and Texas Instruments fly the aircraft.
Malta-based VistaJet operates twenty eight 6000s, one Global XRS and has confirmed a delivery schedule of multiple Global 7500 throughout 2021; Lisbon-based NetJets Europe flies four 6000s.

A dozen 6000s are registered in the Isle of Man for anonymity, a few are registered in the Cayman Islands.
Four are registered in Austria, three in Switzerland, two in France and Denmark, and one each in Finland, Germany, Ireland and Turkey. Three are registered in China, one in Malaysia and one in Hong Kong.
Two are based in São Paulo, two are in South Africa and one is in India.

Civil

The aircraft is operated by private individuals, companies, executive charter operators and government agencies, including:
 ACM Air Charter, Baden-Baden
 Crystal Luxury Air
 FedEx
 Flexjet
 ExecuJet Aviation Group, Zurich
 Netjets, a Berkshire Hathaway subsidiary
 Canonical CEO Mark Shuttleworth through HBD Venture Capital
 TAG Aviation, Switzerland 
 Tiriac Air, Romania 
 Qatar Executive, a business jet subsidiary of Qatar Airways
 VistaJet, Malta

Military

Former operators

 Royal Air Force (June 2007 – March 2021) 
 No. 5 Squadron RAF - 5 (Bombardier airframe modified as Raytheon Sentinel R1 by Raytheon)

Specifications

Accidents and incidents 
As of 27 January 2020, six Global Express have been damaged beyond repair in hull-loss incidents.

See also

References

External links

 
 
 
 

1990s Canadian business aircraft
Global Express
T-tail aircraft
Twinjets
Aircraft first flown in 1996
Low-wing aircraft